In computer science, coalescing is a part of memory management in which two adjacent free blocks of computer memory are merged.

When a program no longer requires certain blocks of memory, these blocks of memory can be freed. Without coalescing, these blocks of memory stay separate from each other in their original requested size, even if they are next to each other. If a subsequent request for memory specifies a size of memory that cannot be met with an integer number of these (potentially unequally-sized) freed blocks, these neighboring blocks of freed memory cannot be allocated for this request. Coalescing alleviates this issue by setting the neighboring blocks of freed memory to be contiguous without boundaries, such that part or all of it can be allocated for the request.

Among other techniques, coalescing is used to reduce external fragmentation, but is not totally effective. Coalescing can be done as soon as blocks are freed, or it can be deferred until some time later (known as deferred coalescing), or it might not be done at all.

Coalescence and related techniques like heap compaction, can be used in garbage collection.

See also 
 Timer coalescing

References

External links
 The Memory Management Reference, Beginner's Guide Allocation

Automatic memory management